Lilac festival is an annual street festival held in Calgary, Alberta, Canada. The festival has grown to entertain over 80,000 people each spring. The lilac (Syringa) flowers are often blooming throughout the area at this time.

The festival takes place along the 13 blocks of 4th Street (between 13th Avenue South and Elbow Drive) in the Beltline and Mission neighborhoods. It is an all day free event and is open to all ages. At 10:00 am (MT), a parade signals the start of the festival. The parade begins along 4th Street from 25th Avenue SW to 13th Avenue SW. The festival features over 500 vendors such as entertainment stages, street dancing, musical talent, artisan vendors, food, and other business stalls. The festival also includes bouncy castles for young children to utilize.

History 
The Lilac Festival started out as a small neighborhood celebration in 1989 by the Cliff Bungalow-Mission Community Association and the 4th Street Business Revitalization Zone. In 2005 it had an estimated 120,000 attendance. Lilac festival has been voted Calgary's best free festival in 2006.

In 2007, the festival was held on May 27.In 2018, the approximate attendance is over 100,000 people.

Two years later, the festival was scrapped caused by the COVID-19 pandemic.

Sponsors 
Multiple organizations sponsor the Lilac Festival such as the following:

 Direct Energy
The City of Calgary
 BitNATIONAL 
 Alberta Culture and Tourism
 Park Point
 Dogtopia
 Alberta Foundations for the Arts

Media Sponsors include the following Calgary-based radio stations:

 90.3 Amp Radio 
 Funny 1060AM
 XL 103 FM
 X92.9
 CJAY92 
 98.5 Virgin Radio

See also
Festivals in Alberta
Lilac Festival (Mackinac Island)
Lilac Festival (New York)
List of festivals in Calgary

References

Festivals in Calgary
Flower festivals in Canada
Fairs in Alberta
Street fairs
1989 establishments in Alberta
Recurring events established in 1989